USS Caddo Parish, originally named LST-515, was an  built for the United States Navy during World War II. Like many of her class, she was not originally named and was properly referred to by her hull designation. On 1 July 1955, she was given the name Caddo Parish, named after Caddo Parish, Louisiana, she was the only U.S. Naval vessel to bear the name.

Construction
LST-515 was laid down on 3 September 1943, at Seneca, Illinois, by the Chicago Bridge & Iron Company; launched on 31 December 1943; sponsored by Miss Rebekah Brown; and commissioned on 28 January 1944.

Service history
During World War II, LST-515 was assigned to the European Theater. She was one of the eight LST's that took part in the disastrous "Exercise Tiger", a practice for the planned invasion of France, in April 1944.

LST-515 participated in the Invasion of Normandy in June 1944. Following the war, LST-515 performed occupation duty in the Far East until mid-November 1952. She also saw postwar service with the Service Force, U.S. Atlantic Fleet.

Upon her return to the United States, she was redesignated Caddo Parish, on 1 July 1955. The ship was decommissioned on 20 October 1955, and recommissioned on 2 August 1963.

The tank landing ship performed service in Vietnam until transferred to the Republic of the Philippines as grant aid on 26 November 1969, she served the Philippine Navy as RPS Bataan (LT-85).

Awards and honors
LST-515 received one battle stars for World War II service, and nine battle stars, one Navy Unit Commendation, and one Meritorious Unit Commendation for Vietnam War service.

References

Bibliography

Further reading
 

LST-491-class tank landing ships
World War II amphibious warfare vessels of the United States
Caddo Parish, Louisiana
Ships built in Seneca, Illinois
1943 ships